Elaea or Elaia was a town of ancient Bithynia on the coast of the Sinus Astacenus in the Propontis.

Its site is located near Zeytin Burnu, in Asiatic Turkey.

References

Populated places in Bithynia
Former populated places in Turkey
History of Kocaeli Province